Kesava Reddy (10 March 1946 – 13 February 2015) was a renowned Telugu novelist. Hailing from Andhra Pradesh state in India. In his writings he addresses many of the important social problems in India like poverty, prejudices, and superstitions, and encourages people to be socially responsible. He successfully bridges the idealistic and the popular styles of literature. His novel "Athadu Adavini Jayinchadu" was one of his major writings. 'Munemma', 'Moogavani Pillanagrovi' and 'Smasanam Dunne' were among his other novels. Some were translated into English and other languages.

Life
Kesava Reddy was born in Thalapula Palli, Chittoor District, Andhra Pradesh to Ranga Reddy P, a farmer.
He did his early education in S.V University, Tirupathi. He obtained his MBBS degree from Pondicherry University, and his pg diploma in dermatology in CMC medical college, Vellore. Reddy worked as a medical officer in Victoria Hospital, Dichpally, Nizamabad. He later retired and settled in Nizamabad town.

Interviews
Interview by All India Radio, Nizamabad -

Other videos
Review of Novel Athadu Adavini Jayinchaadu
Antakriyalu

Blogs
Hyderabad book trust blog

External links
 Authors eBooks and print books list
 Set of Seven Books
 Amazon Books

Novels

See also
 List of Indian writers
 Namdeo Dhasal
 Tapan Kumar Pradhan

References

Indian male novelists
Telugu writers
2015 deaths
1946 births
20th-century Indian novelists
21st-century Indian novelists
People from Chittoor district
Novelists from Andhra Pradesh
20th-century Indian male writers
21st-century Indian male writers
Pondicherry University alumni